Bak-Anime is an annual two-day anime convention held at the Kern County Fairgrounds in Bakersfield, California by the staff of SacAnime. The convention is the sister conventions to the Bakersfield Comic Con, Sacramento Comic, Toy and Anime Show (Sac-Con), and SacAnime.

Programming
The convention typically offers an artists’ alley, card game tournaments, cosplay contest, dealer's room, and a swap meet.

History
The convention began due to the requests of fans from the Bakersfield Comic Con. Bak-Anime in winter 2013 moved to the Bakersfield Marriott due to growth and for the fall 2013 event expanded to two days. The expansion in the fall was considered a risk due to the increased costs of events run at that time of the year. The convention returned to one day in June 2014, and re-expanded to two days in January 2015. The 2019 event occupied two of the Kern County Fairgrounds buildings. Bak-Anime 2020 was cancelled due to the COVID-19 pandemic. Bak-Anime 2021 was also cancelled due to the COVID-19 pandemic.

Event history

References

External links
 Bak-Anime Website

Anime conventions in the United States
Recurring events established in 2010
2010 establishments in California
Annual events in California
Conventions in California
Tourist attractions in Kern County, California
Culture of Bakersfield, California
Tourist attractions in Bakersfield, California